The Killing Floor is a 1984 American made-for-television drama film directed by Bill Duke which highlights the plights of workers fighting to build an interracial labor union in the meatpacking industry in the years leading up to the Chicago race riot of 1919. The film debuted on PBS via the American Playhouse series on April 10, 1984 and was produced by Public Forum Productions, an independent company founded by the film's writer Elsa Rassbach. The teleplay was later adapted by Leslie Lee. In July 2021, the film was shown in the Cannes Classics section at the 2021 Cannes Film Festival.

Plot 
Based on real individuals and actual events, the film focuses on two poor black sharecroppers who leave Mississippi for the Chicago stockyards to seek out employment opportunities vacated by soldiers who had departed for World War I. Frank Custer (played by Damien Leake) and Thomas Joshua (Ernest Rayford) eventually secure jobs working in the infamous meatpacking industry, where they are forced to confront racism, labor disputes, layoffs, and union organizing.

Custer, the film’s main protagonist, is eventually persuaded by his fellow workers to join the Amalgamated Meat Cutters & Butcher Workmen of North America Union, pitting him against a variety of forces, including his non-union black co-workers, as well as the Polish, Irish, Lithuanian, and Germans also living and working in the area.

The film focuses on many individuals who were responsible for leading the charge to build strong, interracial labor unions in the 1930s.

Cast 
 Damien Leake as Frank Custer
 Alfre Woodard as Mattie, Custer's wife
 Dennis Farina as Supervisor, killing floor supervisor
 Ernest Rayford as Thomas Joshua
 Moses Gunn as Heavy Williams, anti-union antagonist
 Clarence Felder as Bremer, union leader
 John Mahoney as Thomas Condon, meatpacking company representative

Production 
Rassbach did extensive research on Chicago's history while writing the story, and hired Lee to draft a manuscript. The total budget for the film was $1.2 million, and funding was culled from a variety of unorthodox sources. Given the film's focus on Chicago's labor history, Rassbach approached more than three dozen unions for support, eliciting donations ranging from $1,000 to $300,000. The film's end credits include a long list of guilds and locals who contributed.

Filmed in Chicago, the production was made at a challenging time for unions, after Ronald Reagan had fired over 11,000 striking members of the Professional Air Traffic Controllers Organization in 1981. Conversely, Chicago had recently elected their first African American mayor, Harold Washington, whose campaign helped recruit numerous black extras to appear in the film. In addition, the local Teamsters were said to believe in the film's objective, and worked for half-pay during production.

Reception 
The film was selected for the International Critics Week (Semaine de la critique) at the Cannes Film Festival in 1985, and winner of the Sundance Film Festival's Special Jury Prize in that same year.

Release information 
Originally, the film was set to be the initial production for a PBS series of ten historical docu-dramas exploring the little-known history of American workers. Rassbach developed the project together with a cohort of historians and screenwriters, though The Killing Floor was the only film ever made in the series. To recognize the 100th anniversary of the Chicago race riots in 2019, the film underwent 4K DCP digital restoration by the University of California-Los Angeles Film & Television Archive.

References

External links
 
 
 
 Official Trailer

1984 films
1984 television films
1984 drama films
American independent films
American films based on actual events
American drama films
American Playhouse
African-American drama films
Films about activists
Films about the labor movement
Films about racism
Films directed by Bill Duke
Films set in the 1910s
Films set in 1917
Films set in 1919
Films set in Chicago
Films shot in Chicago
Sundance Film Festival award winners
World War I television films
1980s American films